John Dean "Jack" Atchason (November 16, 1936 - February 5, 2020) was an American football end. He played college football at Western Illinois University, and played professionally in the American Football League in 1960, for the Boston Patriots and the Houston Oilers.

Atchason died on February 5, 2020.

See also
 List of American Football League players

References

1936 births
2020 deaths
American football ends
Boston Patriots players
Houston Oilers players
Western Illinois Leathernecks football players
Sportspeople from Springfield, Illinois
Players of American football from Illinois